The Standing Conference of the Canonical Orthodox Bishops in the Americas (SCOBA) was an organization of bishops from Eastern Orthodox Christian jurisdictions in the Americas. It acted as a clearinghouse for educational, charitable, and missionary work in the Americas.  In 2010, it was replaced by the Assembly of Canonical Orthodox Bishops of North and Central America.

The members of SCOBA were the archbishops, metropolitan bishops, and bishops of the canonical Eastern Orthodox Churches in North and South America.  These are churches in full communion with the four ancient Greek Orthodox Patriarchates – Ecumenical Patriarchate of Constantinople (Istanbul, Turkey), Patriarch of Antioch (now in Damascus, Syria), Greek Orthodox Patriarchate of Alexandria (Egypt), Greek Orthodox Patriarch of Jerusalem – and with the Patriarchate of Moscow.

Jurisdictions 
 Ecumenical Patriarchate
 Greek Orthodox Archdiocese of America
 Albanian Orthodox Diocese of America (not to be confused with the Albanian Orthodox Archdiocese in America, which is an archdiocese within the OCA)
 American Carpatho-Russian Orthodox Diocese
 Ukrainian Orthodox Church of the USA
 Ukrainian Orthodox Church of Canada
 Antiochian Orthodox Archdiocese of North America
 Russian Orthodox Church in the USA (parishes directly under the Patriarch of Moscow)
 Serbian Orthodox Church in the USA and Canada
 Romanian Orthodox Archdiocese in America and Canada
 Bulgarian Orthodox Church Diocese of America, Canada & Australia
 Orthodox Church in America (the only autocephalous Orthodox church in North America, its autocephaly granted by the Patriarch of Moscow, is however not recognized by the Ecumenical Patriarchate of Constantinople, though still in communion with it)

Agencies 

The main agencies of SCOBA along with their dates of establishment are

 The Orthodox Christian Education Commission (OCEC), 1960 
 The Eastern Orthodox Committee on Scouting (EOCS), 1960 
 The Orthodox Christian Fellowship (OCF) 1965, 2001 
 International Orthodox Christian Charities (IOCC), 1992
 The Orthodox Christian Mission Center (OCMC), 1994 
 The Orthodox Christian Network (OCN), 2003

See also 
 Eastern Orthodoxy in North America
 Eastern Orthodox Church
 List of Eastern Orthodox jurisdictions in North America
 Archbishop of America

External links 
 
 SCOBA members 
 SCOBA on the website of the Orthodox Church in America
 Albanian Diocese affiliated with the Ecumenical Patriarchate

Eastern Orthodox Church bodies in North America
1960 establishments in the United States
20th-century Eastern Orthodoxy